The Sky Kings was an American country music supergroup formed in 1991 as Four Wheel Drive. The band consisted of John Cowan, Bill Lloyd, Patrick Simmons and Rusty Young. They were signed to a recording deal with RCA Nashville and completed an album which for the label was never released.

Warner Bros. Records signed the group in 1993. Threatened with lawsuits from bands who had copyrighted the name Four Wheel Drive, they secured the rights to the name The Sky Kings. After opening for The Doobie Brothers on their 1993 tour, Simmons left The Sky Kings to rejoin The Doobie Brothers. Now a trio, The Sky Kings released three singles on Warner Bros.: "Picture Perfect," "Fooled Around and Fell in Love" (a cover of the Elvin Bishop hit) and "That Just About Says It All." "Picture Perfect" was the only single to chart, peaking at No. 52 on the Billboard Hot Country Singles & Tracks chart. An eponymous album was scheduled to be released in 1997, but eventually shelved. Rhino Handmade released From Out of the Blue, an album which collected the entire unreleased 1997 Warner Bros. album, non-album Warner Bros. singles, and recordings and demos made for a second unreleased Warner Bros. album, in 2000.

Discography

Albums

Singles

Music videos

References

External links
[ allmusic ((( The Sky Kings > Overview )))]

American country music groups
Warner Records artists
American musical trios
Musical groups established in 1991
Musical groups disestablished in 1997
Country music supergroups
1991 establishments in the United States
American supergroups